iPadOS is a mobile operating system for tablet computers developed by Apple Inc. It was first released as a modification of iOS starting with version 13.1 on September 24, 2019. Before the release of iPadOS, iPads were released with iPhone OS, which was later renamed to iOS. New iPadOS versions are released every year mostly in sync with iOS, tvOS, and watchOS.

Overview

Releases

iPadOS 13
iPadOS 13 is the first major release of iPadOS, an iPad-specific fork of iOS meant to emphasize the iPad's multitasking and tablet-centric features. It was previewed at Apple's WWDC 2019, and released on September 24, 2019.

It added a dark mode for the interface, and Memoji support for iPads with the Apple A9 chips or more recent chips. New multitasking options were added that could display multiple applications simultaneously, including Split View and Slide Over. Apps gained multi-window support. These windows can be navigated using an interface similar to Mission Control on macOS. System-wide support for picture-in-picture was added. Safari gained new keyboard shortcuts and a download manager, and was set to display the desktop versions of websites by default, instead of the mobile version. A new feature, Sidecar, allows an iPad to function as a second monitor for Macs, which allows the Apple Pencil to be used with Mac applications. The Files app gained support for external drives, which can connect to an iPad with USB-C, or through the Lightning Camera Connection Kit for iPads with a Lightning port. Preliminary support for mice and trackpad was added to iPad OS 13, with full support added in iPadOS 13.4.

iPadOS 14
iPadOS 14 was released on September 16, 2020. It added new widgetes in the Today View, a shelf to the left of the first home screen. The standardized system interfaces for Siri and voice calling applications like Skype were shrunk to the size of notifications, to allow users to continue interacting with the open app. Spotlight search gained improved search suggestions and more detailed web search results. iPadOS 14 also added support for mounting encrypted APFS external hard drives.

iPadOS 15
iPadOS 15 was released on September 20, 2021. It introduced an App Library, which automatically categorizes apps into one page, and also added the ability to place widgets on the home screen. Both features had previously only been available on the iPhone, with iOS 14. It also added a new multitasking user interface, with window controls to activate Split View, Slide Over, or full screen in one tap. Quick Notes allows users to create notes by swiping from the bottom right corner, from the Control Center, or with a keyboard shortcut. Tab Groups were added to Safari. iPadOS 15.4 added Universal Control: a user can use a Mac or iPad's keyboard and trackpad across all of their other Macs and iPads, by moving the mouse cursor past the edge of the screen in the direction of the other device.

iPadOS 16
iPadOS 16 was released on October 24, 2022. It included a new Weather app, Passkeys in Safari, and a new Stage Manager feature that enables more powerful multitasking. iPadOS 16.2 added the Freeform app, a digital whiteboard which can sync across Apple devices.

Hardware support

See also

 iOS version history
 Issues relating to iOS

References

External links
  – official site
  – official site

Lists of operating systems
Software version histories
Tablet operating systems